Robert Anderson was mayor of Williamsburg, Virginia three times. He served from 1812 to 1813, 1820 to 1821 and finally 1828 to 1829.

References

Mayors of Williamsburg, Virginia